The 2009 European Fencing Championships was held at the International Fair Plovdiv in Plovdiv, Bulgaria. The event took place from July 14 to July 19, 2009.

Schedule

Medal summary

Men's events

Women's events

Medal table

Results overview

Men

Foil individual

Foil team

Epée individual

Epée team

Sabre individual

Sabre team

Women

Sabre individual

Sabre team

Foil individual

Foil team

Epée individual

Épée team

External links
Official site

European Fencing Championships
W
Fencing Championships
Fencing Championships
Sport in Plovdiv